The 78th Boat Race took place on 27 March 1926.  Held annually, the Boat Race is a side-by-side rowing race between crews from the Universities of Oxford and Cambridge along the River Thames.  Umpired by former rower Frederick I. Pitman, Cambridge won by five lengths in a time of 19 minutes 29 seconds in the largest winning margin since 1912.  It was Cambridge's third consecutive victory and took the overall record in the event to 40–37 in Oxford's favour.

Background

The Boat Race is a side-by-side rowing competition between the University of Oxford (sometimes referred to as the "Dark Blues") and the University of Cambridge (sometimes referred to as the "Light Blues").  The race was first held in 1829, and since 1845 has taken place on the  Championship Course on the River Thames in southwest London.  The rivalry is a major point of honour between the two universities and followed throughout the United Kingdom and worldwide.  Cambridge went into the race as reigning champions, having won the 1925 race as Oxford became waterlogged, with Oxford leading overall with 40 victories to Cambridge's 36 (excluding the "dead heat" of 1877).

Oxford's coaches were H. R. Baker (who rowed for the Dark Blues in the 1908 and 1909 races), G. C. Bourne who had rowed for the university in the 1882 and 1883 races, and A. V. Douglas (who took part in the 1922 and 1925 races).  Cambridge were coached by William Dudley Ward (who had rowed in 1897, 1899 and 1900 races), Francis Escombe, David Alexander Wauchope (who had rowed in the 1895 race), and H. W. Willis.  For the eighteenth and final year the umpire was Old Etonian Frederick I. Pitman who had rowed for Cambridge in the 1884, 1885 and 1886 races. He would be replaced in the following year's race by Charles Burnell.

Cambridge opted to arrive a fortnight later than usual at the Thames, and forwent their typical practice at Ely.  According to former Oxford rower and author George Drinkwater, the Light Blues "showed great promise" only to be struck by measles, forcing a late replacement in the boat.  Oxford, while "not so pleasing in appearance" were considered to be favourites for the race.

Crews
Four of the Cambridge crew had taken part in the Boat Race previously, including W. F. Smith, G. H. Ambler, and cox J. A. Brown, all of whom were participating in their third consecutive event. The crew also included E. C. Hamilton-Russell who had won three finals at the 1925 Henley Royal Regatta. Oxford saw three rowers return to the boat in J. D. W. Thomson, E. C. T. Edwards and C. E. Pitman. Cambridge's Australian number six J. B. Bell was the only non-British participant registered in the race.

Race

Oxford won the toss and elected to start from the Surrey station, handing the Middlesex side of the river to Cambridge.  In conditions described by Drinkwater as "excellent" with "smooth water but only a moderate tide", Pitman started the race at 12:27 pm.  Although Oxford marginally out-rated their opponents, the crews were level after the first minute.  As the crews passed the Mile Post, the Dark Blues held a small lead which they had extended to around half a length by Harrods Furniture Depository.  Cambridge made a push and reduced the deficit to a quarter-length by the time the boats passed below Hammersmith Bridge.  Following a series of spurts around the outside of the bend in the river, Cambridge gained to draw level by HMS Stork. 

The Dark Blues' rhythm faltered and their number five missed a stroke as they passed Chiswick Eyot, allowing Cambridge to move away to take a clear lead.  Two lengths ahead by Chiswick Steps, the Light Blues increased their stroke rate and pulled further away to win by five lengths, the largest winning margin since the 1912 race, in a time of 19 minutes and 29 seconds.  It was their third consecutive victory and their seventh in eight races.

References
Notes

Bibliography

External links
 Official website

1926 in English sport
The Boat Race
March 1926 sports events
1926 sports events in London